Komljenović is a Serbian and Croatian surname. It may refer to:

Dejan Komljenović, Slovenian footballer
Fabijan Komljenović, retired Croatian footballer
Ivo Komljenović, Bosnian politician
Jelena Komljenović, Serbian writer
Marko Komljenović, Austro-Hungarian Serb oberlieutnant
Slobodan Komljenović, retired Serbian footballer

See also
Komlenović, surname
Komnenović, surname

Serbian surnames
Croatian surnames